The Uspanapa River, also known as the Uxpanapa or Uzpanapa, is a river of Mexico.  It originates in the foothills of Sierra Atravesada subrange of the Sierra Madre de Chiapas mountains in the state of Oaxaca.  It flows through the Selva Zoque and the municipio of Uxpanapa in the state of Veracruz from which it takes its name.  It is a tributary of the Coatzacoalcos River, which it joins downstream from the city of Minatitlán and upstream from Nanchital.

See also
List of rivers of Mexico

References

Atlas of Mexico, 1975 (http://www.lib.utexas.edu/maps/atlas_mexico/river_basins.jpg).
The Prentice Hall American World Atlas, 1984.
Rand McNally, The New International Atlas, 1993.

Rivers of Oaxaca
Rivers of Veracruz
Petén–Veracruz moist forests